Freddie Nelle Webb (born November 24, 1942) is a Filipino retired basketball player and coach, former politician, and television and radio personality.

Education
He completed his elementary education at San Beda College and his degree in Bachelor of Arts in English at Colegio de San Juan de Letran.

Personal life
He is married to Elizabeth Pagaspas of Tanauan, Batangas with whom he has six children. He is the father of Hubert, Pinky, and Jason Webb.

Career

In basketball
Webb first played for the Letran Knights (1960–1964) and became a star for the team. After college, he played in the MICAA with the YCO Painters (1965–1975) and in the PBA with the Tanduay Rhum Makers (1976–1978).

He was a member of the national basketball team that participated in the 1972 Summer Olympics. After retiring in 1978, Webb coached YCO-Tanduay (1981–1983) and Shell (1985) in the Philippine Basketball Association. He also coached the Letran Knights for one season in 1975 and finished the season as runner up to the Ateneo Blue Eagles.

In politics
Webb was elected in 1971 as city councilor in Pasay, which he held up to 1978.

In 1987, Webb ran and won in the Philippine legislative elections as the first representative of the lone district of Parañaque. From 1987 to 1988, he was awarded one of the Ten Outstanding Congressman of the Year Award. He sponsored the provisions creating the Sangguniang Kabataan in the Local Government Code of 1991.

In 1992, he was elected Senator, placing 12th to earn a six-year term. As Senator, he held various chairmanships like Senate Committees/Committee on Health and Demography and the Committee on Games and Amusements. He also headed the Senate Ad Hoc Committee on AIDS and the Congressional Commission on Health. He authored, co-authored and steered into law, acts such as the National Health Insurance Act, (R.A.7875), The Hepatitis-B Immunization Act, (R.A. 7846), The Corneal Transplant Law, the Voluntary Blood Donation Act, (R.A.7719) and the Act Granting Benefits to Barangay Health Workers (R.A. 7883). He ran for re-election in 1998 but was unsuccessful, placing 23rd out of the 12 seats up for election.

On television and radio
Webb began a career in movies and television from his days as a basketball player up to the present. He is also a radio personality and sportscaster.

After the declaration of Martial Law in 1972, Webb hosted the daily show Pa-bandying, Bandying in 1973 over RPN. But he became a household name when he was cast as Jimmy Capistrano, the modelling and talent agency proprietor in IBC's Chicks to Chicks in 1979. He was paired with comedienne Nova Villa, who was Ines Capistrano, the wacky housewife of Jimmy Capistrano. Their team-up was hilariously accepted and where the funny line "Sweetheart, ligo na tayo", started.

Filmography

Television

Movies

Radio
Sports Talk "Co-Host with Gretchen Fullido" (DZMM, 2004–2014)
FastBreak "Co-Host with Boyet Sison" (DZMM, August 2, 2014 – 2020)

References

External links
 

Living people
1942 births
Filipino men's basketball coaches
Filipino people of German descent
Filipino people of British descent
Filipino people of English descent 
Letran Knights basketball players
Shell Turbo Chargers coaches
Philippine Basketball Association broadcasters
Olympic basketball players of the Philippines
Philippines men's national basketball team players
Filipino men's basketball players
Basketball players at the 1972 Summer Olympics
People from Parañaque
People from Pasay
Basketball players from Metro Manila
Filipino actor-politicians
Filipino male television actors
Filipino male film actors
Filipino sportsperson-politicians
Male actors from Manila
Senators of the 10th Congress of the Philippines
Senators of the 9th Congress of the Philippines
Laban ng Demokratikong Pilipino politicians
Members of the House of Representatives of the Philippines from Parañaque
Metro Manila city and municipal councilors
Philippines men's national basketball team coaches
Tanduay Rhum Masters players
Freddie
Letran Knights basketball coaches
Tanduay Rhum Masters coaches
ABS-CBN personalities
GMA Network personalities